Alan Andrew Vaughan (born 18 June 1972) is a British boxer. He competed in the men's lightweight event at the 1992 Summer Olympics.

Vaughan won the 1995 Amateur Boxing Association British light-welterweight title, when boxing out of the Huyton ABC.

References

External links
 

1972 births
Living people
British male boxers
Olympic boxers of Great Britain
Boxers at the 1992 Summer Olympics
People from Huyton
Lightweight boxers